The 2023 Burnie International was a professional tennis tournament played on outdoor hard courts. It was the 18th (men) and 12th (women) editions of the tournament which was part of the 2023 ATP Challenger Tour and the 2023 ITF Women's World Tennis Tour. It took place in Burnie, Australia between 30 January and 5 February 2023.

Men's singles main-draw entrants

Seeds

 1 Rankings are as of 16 January 2023.

Other entrants
The following players received wildcards into the singles main draw:
  Alex Bolt
  Blake Ellis
  Jeremy Jin

The following players received entry from the qualifying draw:
  Charlie Camus
  Jake Delaney
  Matthew Romios
  Daisuke Sumizawa
  Yusuke Takahashi
  Brandon Walkin

Champions

Men's singles

 Rinky Hijikata def.  James Duckworth 6–3, 6–3.

Women's singles

 Storm Hunter def.  Olivia Gadecki 6–4, 6–3.

Men's doubles

 Marc Polmans /  Max Purcell def.  Luke Saville /  Tristan Schoolkate 7–6(7–4), 6–4.

Women's doubles

 Mai Hontama /  Eri Hozumi def.  Arina Rodionova /  Ena Shibahara 4–6, 6–3, [10–6].

References

2023 ATP Challenger Tour
2023 ITF Women's World Tennis Tour
2023 in Australian tennis
January 2023 sports events in Australia
February 2023 sports events in Australia